Bermuda is a suburb of Nuneaton in the English county of Warwickshire.

Bermuda was originally a small pit village built in 1893 to house workers for the Griff Colliery Company's new mine, "Griff Clara". The village initially consisted of ninety miners' houses, a working men's club, and a mission hall. The new construction replaced the former workers' housing, known as "the Old Row". Bermuda was named for local landowner Edward Newdegate, a former Governor of Bermuda.

The village was constructed next to local transportation and industrial infrastructure, including the Griff Arm of the Coventry Canal and the Stanley Brickworks.

Bermuda Village itself is preserved by planning regulations as an "area of restraint", meaning that no major redevelopment should take place in the village itself.

Bermuda Park was built on land next to Bermuda Village in the mid-2000s. It is a large modern housing estate with some notable features such as a village green, a large artificial hill (known locally as "Mount Bermuda") and Bermuda Lake. The estate backs onto open countryside near Arbury Hall and a large industrial and leisure park. The estate is supported by Bermuda Park Community, an organisation focussed on improving the quality of life for residents of the area. The Bermuda Park railway station was opened serving the area in 2016.

The village made it to national and even international headlines in 1972 when a large dump of cyanide was discovered on a children's playground, probably sourced from the local car industry. This eventually lead to a change in legislation that made dumping dangerous waste illegal.

Bermuda contains “Bermuda Park” which has an Odean Cinema, Bowling alley, Soft Play Area, Hotel, KFC, McDonalds, Starbucks, Subway and a restaurant Middlemarch Farm. It’s located South of the Bermuda housing area, Its on the A444 ‘Griff Lane’. 

On 22 October 2017, a gunman, David Clarke, aged 53, stormed into the bowling alley. He took many hostages and made national headlines. Eventually he pleaded guilty to two counts of false imprisonment, one count of possession of a firearm with intent to cause fear of violence, one count of possession of an imitation firearm with intent to commit an indictable offence, two counts of possession of a bladed article in a public place and one count of criminal damage.

References
A trip to Bermuda, by Peter Lee

External links
Bermuda Park Community Website

Populated places established in 1893
Areas of Nuneaton